Kevin Paige (born October 10, 1966, Memphis, Tennessee) is a recording artist on Chrysalis who was most active in the late 1980s and early 1990s. His eponymously titled 1989 solo album sported a pair of top 40 singles, "Don't Shut Me Out" and "Anything I Want".

Career
After the success of his self-titled debut album, Paige toured as an opening act on pop singer Debbie Gibson's world tour.

He went on to become a songwriter for Zomba Music Group and a music-minister at Lindenwood Christian Church in Memphis, before becoming music director at Catholic Church of the Incarnation in Collierville, Tennessee. He also released a Christmas CD with his wife, Bethany Paige, entitled A W.O.W. Christmas in 2004, as well as a contemporary Christian disc entitled Faith, Hope, Love, Passion that same year. Kevin and Bethany released the CD This Much Love in 2006, which includes secular and non-secular songs written by Kevin.

Discography

Studio albums

Singles

References

External links
 

1966 births
Living people
American male pop singers
Singers from Tennessee
Musicians from Memphis, Tennessee